Anne Casimir Pyramus (or Pyrame) de Candolle (20 February 1836, Geneva – 3 October 1918, Chêne-Bougeries) was a Swiss botanist, the son of Alphonse Pyramus de Candolle.

Early life and education
He studied chemistry, physics and mathematics in Paris (1853–57), later spending time in England, where he met with Miles Berkeley. In 1859 he visited Algeria, and during the following year, continued his education in Berlin. Afterwards, he returned to Geneva as an assistant and colleague to his father. He married Anna-Mathilde Marcet and they had four children: Raymond Charles de Candolle (1864–1935), Florence Pauline Lucienne de Candolle (1865–1943), Richard Émile Augustin de Candolle (1868–1920) and Reyne Marguerite de Candolle (1876–1958).

Career
In the field of plant systematics, he used criteria such as stem structure and/or leaf arrangement as a basis of anatomical criteria. As a plant physiologist, he conducted investigations on the movement of leaves, the curling of tendrils, the effect of low temperatures on seed germination and the influence of ultraviolet radiation on flower formation. He was particularly interested in the botanical family Piperaceae.

He held honorary degrees (doctor honoris causa) from the universities of Rostock, Geneva, Aberdeen and Uppsala.

References

External links
 

20th-century Swiss botanists
Plant physiologists
1836 births
1918 deaths
Scientists from Geneva
19th-century Swiss botanists